Adeoyo Hospital formerly known as "Adeoyo maternity hospital" (established in 1928) is a large "now known as a general" hospital. It is located in the city of Ibadan, Oyo state, Nigeria.

History 
The hospital was established in 1928, It was formerly used as a college hospital by then University of Ibadan between 1948 and 1954 by upgrading the hospital with an additional fifty beds, laboratory, X-ray annex, medical lecture rooms, and mortuary.

The hospital provides maternal and child healthcare services to people in Ibadan and its surrounding. It is made up of antenatal clinic, labor ward, antenatal ward, gynecological ward, lying in ward, children's ward, immunization clinic, post-caesarian section ward, gynecological clinic and family planning clinic.

Renovation 
In 2016, the maternity unit was renovated under a Public-Private-Partnership.

References

Hospitals in Ibadan
Hospitals established in 1928
1928 establishments in Nigeria